Talitridae is a family of amphipods. Terrestrial species are often referred to as landhoppers and beach dwellers are called sandhoppers or sand fleas. The name sand flea is misleading, though, because these talitrid amphipods are not siphonapterans (true fleas), do not bite people, and are not limited to sandy beaches.

Marine amphipods are often washed up in the strandline, but die rapidly on drying out. Talitrids differ in being able to survive for a long time out of water; some Southern Hemisphere species are entirely terrestrial.

It contains these genera:

 Austropacifica Lowry & Springthorpe, 2019
 Floresorchestia Bousfield, 1984
 Gazia Lowry & Springthorpe, 2019
 Americorchestia Bousfield, 1991
 Asiaorchestia Lowry & Myers, 2019
 Britorchestia Lowry & Bopiah, 2012
 Persianorchestia Momtazi, Lowry & Hekmatara, 2017
 Pseudorchestoidea Bousfield, 1982
 Sardorchestia Ruffo in Tafani, Ugolini, Bazzicalupo, Mengoni & Ruffo, 2004
 Africorchestia Lowry & Coleman, 2011
 Amphiatlantica Lowry & Myers, 2019
 Aokiorchestia Morino, 2020
 Atlantorchestoidea Serejo, 2004
 Australorchestia Serejo & Lowry, 2008
 Bellorchestia Serejo & Lowry, 2008
 Bulychevia Lowry & Myers, 2019
†Caecorchestia Hegna & Lazo-Wasem in Hegna, Lazo-Wasem, Serrano-Sánchez & Barragán, 2020
 Canariorchestia Lowry & Myers, 2019
 Capeorchestia Lowry & Baldanzi, 2016
 Cariborchestia Smith, 1998
 Chelorchestia Bousfield, 1984
 Chevreuxiana Lowry & Myers, 2019
 Chroestia Marsden & Fenwick, 1984
 Clippertonia Lowry & Myers, 2019
 Cryptorchestia Lowry & Fanini, 2013
 Dallwitzia Lowry & Myers, 2019
 Defeo Lowry & Myers, 2019
 Derzhavinia Lowry & Myers, 2019
 Deshayesorchestia Ruffo, 2004
 Ditmorchestia Morino & Miyamoto, 2015
 Ezotinorchestia Morino & Miyamoto, 2016
 Galaporchestia Lowry & Myers, 2019
 Gondwanorchestia Lowry, Myers & Pérez-Schultheiss, 2020
 Hermesorchestia Hughes & Lowry, 2017
 Houlia Lowry & Myers, 2019
 Indiorchestia Lowry & Myers, 2019
 Kaalorchestia Lowry & Myers, 2019
 Kokuborchestia Morino & Miyamoto, 2015
 Laniporchestia Lowry & Myers, 2019
 Lanorchestia Miyamoto & Morino, 2010
 Leptorchestia Morino, 2020
 Lowryella Morino & Miyamoto, 2016
 Macarorchestia Stock, 1989
 Megalorchestia Brandt, 1851
 Mexorchestia Wildish & LeCroy, 2014
 Minamitalitrus White, Lowry & Morino, 2013
 Miyamotoia Morino, 2020
 Mizuhorchestia Morino, 2014
 Morinoia Lowry & Myers, 2019
 Nipponorchestia Morino & Miyamoto, 2015
 Notorchestia Serejo & Lowry, 2008
 Opunorchestia Lowry & Myers, 2019
 Orchestia Leach, 1814
 Orchestoidea Nicolet, 1849
 Paciforchestia Bousfield, 1982
 Palmorchestia Stock & Martin, 1988
 Pickorchestia Lowry & Myers, 2019
 Pictonorchestia Lowry & Springthorpe, 2021
 Platorchestia Bousfield, 1982
 Pyatakovestia Morino & Miyamoto, 2015
 Sinorchestia Miyamoto & Morino, 1999
 Speziorchestia Lowry & Myers, 2019
 Talitrus Latreille, 1802
 Talorchestia Dana, 1852
 Tethorchestia Bousfield, 1984
 Tongorchestia Lowry & Bopiah, 2013
 Transorchestia Bousfield, 1982
 Traskorchestia Bousfield, 1982
 Trinorchestia Bousfield, 1982
 Tropicorchestia Lowry & Springthorpe, 2015
 Vallorchestia Lowry, 2012
 Vietorchestia Dang & Le, 2011
 Yamatorchestia Takahashi & Morino, 2020
 Protaustrotroides Bousfield, 1984

See also

References

External links
 
 

Gammaridea
Taxa named by Constantine Samuel Rafinesque
Crustacean families
Terrestrial crustaceans